Lazo may refer to:

Places
imeni Lazo District, a district in Khabarovsk Krai, Russia
Lazo, Russia, name of several rural localities in Russia
Lazo, a village in Hăsnăşenii Noi Commune, Drochia District, Moldova
Lazo, a village in Alava Commune, Ştefan Vodă District, Moldova
Cape Lazo, a headland on the Comox Peninsula, Vancouver Island, British Columbia, Canada

Other uses
Lazo (surname)
Lazo (musician), a musician from Dominica

See also
Lazovsky (disambiguation)